Thomas Patrick White (September 28, 1888 – February 7, 1968) was an associate justice of the Supreme Court of California from August 18, 1959, to October 31, 1962.

Biography
White was born in the Lincoln Heights district of Los Angeles, California, and educated in the public schools. He graduated from St. Vincent's high school, and studied for a year at St. Vincent's college. He then worked for the Santa Fe Railroad. In 1911, he graduated from the University of Southern California with a LL.B. degree.

Following graduation, White entered private practice in the firm of Randall, Bartlett & White from 1911 to 1913. In 1913, he was appointed judge of the Los Angeles Police Court, taking the seat of H. H. Rose. In August 1914, he helped create a women's division in the court, which included women serving as judges. In 1918, he ran unsuccessfully for Superior Court judge. In 1920, he resigned from the Police Court to enter private practice in Los Angeles with the firm of Irwin, White & Rosecrans, where he employed a young attorney, Louis H. Burke, who went onto the California Supreme Court.

On August 21, 1931, Governor James Rolph appointed White as a judge of the Los Angeles County Superior Court. In 1932, White ran for re-election and won.

On December 5, 1937, Governor Frank Merriam elevated White to the California Court of Appeal, Second Appellate District, Division One. In 1949, Governor Earl Warren appointed him Presiding Justice of that court.

In August 1959, Governor Pat Brown named him an associate justice of the California Supreme Court. After retiring from the bench in October 1962, White continued to occasionally hear cases by designation.

He died on February 7, 1968, in Los Angeles.

Honors and awards
In 1926, he was awarded an honorary Doctor of Laws degree from Loyola Law School and later received the St. Thomas More Medallion. In 1961, he received the Asa V. Call Award from the University of Southern California as outstanding alumnus.

Personal life
White married twice. He married Helen H. White in February 1915. After her death in 1937, at age 67 he re-married to Aline Kathleen De Courcy in Los Angeles on July 18, 1956. She died on November 19, 1959.

References

External links
 Thomas P. White. California Supreme Court Historical Society.
 In Memoriam, 68 Cal. Rptr. 2d 1923 (1969).
 Thomas P. White. California Court of Appeal, Second Appellate District, Division One.
 Past & Present Justices. California State Courts. Retrieved July 19, 2017.

See also
 List of justices of the Supreme Court of California

1888 births
1968 deaths
University of Southern California alumni
Superior court judges in the United States
Judges of the California Courts of Appeal
Justices of the Supreme Court of California
20th-century American judges
20th-century American lawyers
Lawyers from Los Angeles
California Republicans
Loyola Marymount University alumni
Loyola Law School alumni
People from Lincoln Heights, Los Angeles